Bernard Joseph McCahill (born 28 June 1964) is a former rugby union player from New Zealand who played for Auckland RFU and the All Blacks.

McCahill was educated at St Peter's College.
He played in two positions, second five-eighth and centre three-quarter.
He played 32 matches for the All Blacks from 1987 until 1991 including 10 tests. As well as two World Cup tournaments, he participated in 5 overseas tours. He also appeared in five zonal matches, five trials and was in the New Zealand XV and New Zealand B selections in 1991. He scored four tries for New Zealand.

McCahill was first chosen for the first World Cup in 1987 and played in the pool match against Argentina and was a replacement in the quarter-final against Scotland and the semi-final against Wales. He was a backup midfield player until 1991, when he played in four of the World Cup matches.
He is the brother of Sean McCahill, a former Irish rugby international.

References

 
 Ron Palenski (2007) The All Blackography, Hodder Moa. p. 285. 
 For some more biographical details: List of alumni of St Peter's College, Auckland

1964 births
New Zealand people of Irish descent
New Zealand international rugby union players
Living people
New Zealand rugby union players
People educated at St Peter's College, Auckland
Rugby union players from Auckland